Simili (English: "Similar") is an Italian-language studio album by Italian singer Laura Pausini. Released on 6 November 2015, it is her twelfth studio album. Pausini also made a Spanish version of the album Similares, released on 13 November 2015. The first single was released on 25 September 2015 in two versions; in Italian "Lato Destro del Cuore", and the Spanish version "Lado Derecho del Corazón". The Spanish-language version of the album received a nomination for a Grammy Award for Best Latin Pop Album.

Track listings

Italian version

Spanish version
Similares was released on 13 November 2015. All tracks adapted to Spanish by Laura Pausini.

Tour

Laura Pausini began the world tour in 2016 to promote her new album. The tour started in the Imola Velodrome on 25 May 2016, with this concert serving as a General Rehearsal. Officially the tour started with its premiere at the San Siro Stadium on 4 June 2016. This premiere concert, along with the 5 June 2016 concert also in Milan, were recorded as PAUSINI STADI and released in the Italian TV Station RAI1 on 6 September 2016. Then after 5 mega-concerts in Italy, the tour reached the Americas from July to September letting her visit new countries such as Ecuador, Paraguay, and Uruguay, and visit others such as Puerto Rico and Colombia which she didn't visit in +10 years. Although, the 2 shows scheduled in Colombia at Medellin and Bogotá, were cancelled, she stated that she would return on a further occasion. After reaching the Americas, the tour continued through Europe in October 2016, with concerts scheduled in Spain, France, Luxembourg, UK, Belgium, Germany and Switzerland. But she also had to cancel 5 of these concerts (2 in Spain, 2 in France, and 1 in Luxembourg) because of an acute laryngitis. Because of this, she officially started the European tour in England, UK and ended the tour in Munich, Germany.

Charts

Weekly charts

Year-end charts

Certifications and sales

References

2015 albums
Laura Pausini albums
Italian-language albums
Spanish-language albums